Greatest Hymns is the fifth studio album from the Contemporary Christian group Selah. It was released August 25, 2005 on Curb Records. The album contains renditions of classic Christian hymns.

Track listing

Personnel
 Steve Brewster – drums
 Jim Brickman – piano
 Jorgen Carlsson – guitar, bass
 Dane Clark – drums
 Melodie Crittenden – vocals
 Eric Darken – percussion
 Eric Eldenius – drums
 David Grow – keyboards, percussion
 Allan Hall – piano, vocals
 David Hungate – bass
 Jakk Kinkaid – guitar
 Jason Kyle – backing vocals
 Chris Leiber – keyboards
 Jerry McPherson – guitar
 Randy Melson – bass
 John Mock – whistle
 Gordon Mote – organ
 The Nashville String Machine – strings
 Mark Pay – guitar
 Chris Rodriguez – guitar
 John Andrew Schreiner – keyboards 
 Jim Smith – vocals
 Laban Smith – vocals
 Shawn Tubbs – guitar
 Windy Wagner – backing vocals
 Biff Watson – guitar

Awards

At the 37th GMA Dove Awards, the album was nominated for Inspirational Album of the Year.  Two songs from the album were also nominated for awards. "Be Thou My Vision" was nominated for Worship Song of the Year and "All My Praise" was nominated for Inspirational Recorded Song of the Year.

Charts

Certifications

References

2005 albums
Curb Records albums
Selah (band) albums